Rotterdam Hofplein railway station in the Netherlands is a former main-line and RandstadRail station. It was the terminus of the former Hofpleinlijn (Hofplein line) which ran trains between Rotterdam and Scheveningen, and were later curtailed to The Hague central station. It was located very close to the railway line between Rotterdam Centraal and Rotterdam Blaak, but never had a direct connection to it.

History 

Hofplein station was opened on 1 October 1908 by the Zuid-Hollandsche Electrische Spoorweg-Maatschappij. The viaduct (also called the De Hofbogen) was the first major reinforced concrete construction in the Netherlands and is probably the longest (1,9 km) Rijksmonument (since 2002). The station building was destroyed during the Rotterdam Blitz on 14 May 1940, and a new building was opened in 1956, which was demolished for the construction of a railway tunnel between Rotterdam Centraal, Blaak, and Zuid in the early 1990s. When Hofplein station closed on 3 June 2006 for conversion of the Hofpleinlijn to RandstadRail it had one island platform, of which only one side was still in operation.

In 2011, the Hofbogen project office realized the MINI MALL, a compact shopping mall for creative entrepreneurs. For this, the first seven arch spaces of the Hofplein Station were renovated and transformed for a new usage. The great wish of many Rotterdammers is that the viaduct will also play a green role. In addition to being the longest building, it could also become the city's longest park. A 'Hofline' after examples like the crowds of tourists who flock to the 2,3 km long High Line in New York City or the 4,7 km long Coulée verte René-Dumont in Paris.

RandstadRail operation 
On 10 September 2006 Hofplein re-opened as a temporary RandstadRail station on line E.  A new line E tunnel between Melanchthonweg and Rotterdam Centraal opened on 17 August 2010, and Hofplein station was then closed permanently.

RandstadRail services
The following RandstadRail services called at Hofplein between 2006 and 2010:

Gallery

References

Hofplein
Hofplein
Railway stations opened in 1908
Defunct railway stations in the Netherlands
1908 establishments in the Netherlands
Railway stations in the Netherlands opened in the 20th century